Shyam Benegal (born 14 December 1934) is an Indian film director, screenwriter and documentary filmmaker. Often regarded as the pioneer of parallel cinema, he is widely considered as one of the greatest filmmakers post 1970s. He has received several accolades, including eighteen National Film Awards, a Filmfare Award and a Nandi Award. In 2005, he was honoured with the Dadasaheb Phalke Award, India's highest award in the field of cinema. In 1976, he was honoured by the Government of India with the Padma Shri, the fourth-highest civilian honour of the country, and in 1991, he was awarded Padma Bhushan, the third-highest civilian honour for his contributions in the field of arts.
 
Benegal was born in Hyderabad to Sridhar B. Benegal who was prominent in the field of photography. Starting his career as a copywriter, he made his first Documentary film in Gujarati, Gher Betha Ganga (Ganges at the Doorstep) in 1962.  Benegal's first four feature films Ankur (1973), Nishant (1975), Manthan (1976) and Bhumika (1977) made him a pioneer of the new wave film movement of that period. Benegal's films, Mammo (1994), along with Sardari Begum (1996) and Zubeidaa (2001) all of which won National Film Awards for Best Feature Film in Hindi, form the Muslim women Trilogy. Benegal has won the National Film Award for Best Feature Film in Hindi seven times. He was awarded the V. Shantaram Lifetime Achievement Award in 2018.

Early life and education
Shyam Benegal was born on 14 December 1934 in a Konkani-speaking Chitrapur Saraswat Brahmin family in Hyderabad, as Shyam Sunder Benegal. His father hailed from Karnataka. When he was twelve years old, he made his first film, on a camera given to him by his photographer father Sridhar B. Benegal. He received an M.A. in Economics from Osmania University, Hyderabad. There he established the Hyderabad Film Society.

Family
Film director and actor Guru Dutt's maternal grandmother and Shyam's paternal grandmother were sisters, thus making Dutt and Shyam second cousins.

Career

Early career
In 1959, he started working as a copywriter at a Mumbai-based advertising agency, Lintas Advertising, where he steadily rose to become the creative head. Meanwhile, Benegal made his first documentary in Gujarati, Gher Betha Ganga (Ganges at the Doorstep) in 1962. His first feature film had to wait another decade while he worked on the script.

In 1963 he had a brief stint with another advertising agency called ASP (Advertising, Sales and Promotion). During his advertising years, he directed over 900 sponsored documentaries and advertising films.

Between 1966 and 1973, Shyam taught at the Film and Television Institute of India (FTII), Pune, and twice served as the institute's chairman: 1980–83 and 1989–92. By this time he had already started making documentaries. One of his early documentaries A Child of the Streets (1967), garnered him wide acclaim. In all, he has made over 70 documentary and short films.

He was awarded the Homi J. Bhabha Fellowship (1970–72) which allowed him to work at the Children's Television Workshop, New York, and later at Boston's WGBH-TV.

Feature films
After returning to Mumbai, he received independent financing and Ankur (The Seedling) was finally made in 1973. It was a realistic drama of economic and sexual exploitation in his home state, Telangana, and Benegal instantly shot to fame. The film introduced actors Shabana Azmi and Anant Nag and Benegal won the 1975 National Film Award for Second Best Feature Film. Shabana won the National Film Award for Best Actress.

The success that New India Cinema enjoyed in the 1970s and early 1980s could largely be attributed to Shyam Benegal's quartet: Ankur (1973), Nishant (1975), Manthan (1976) and Bhumika (1977). Benegal used a variety of new actors, mainly from the FTII and NSD, such as Naseeruddin Shah, Om Puri, Smita Patil, Shabana Azmi, Kulbhushan Kharbanda and Amrish Puri.

In Benegal's next film, Nishant (Night's End) (1975), a teacher's wife is abducted and gang-raped by four zamindars; officialdom turns a deaf ear to the distraught husband's pleas for help. Manthan (The Churning) (1976) is a film on rural empowerment and is set against the backdrop of Gujarat's fledgling dairy industry. For the first time, over five lakh (half a million) rural farmers in Gujarat contributed  2 each and thus became the film's producers. Upon its release, truckloads of farmers came to see "their" film, making it a success at the box office. After this trilogy on rural oppression, Benegal made a biopic Bhumika (The Role) (1977), broadly based on the life of well-known Marathi stage and film actress of the 1940s, Hansa Wadkar (played by Smita Patil), who led a flamboyant and unconventional life. The main character sets out on an individual search for identity and self-fulfilment, while also grappling with exploitation by men.

In the early 1970s, Shyam made 21 film modules for Satellite Instructional Television Experiment (SITE), sponsored by UNICEF. This allowed him to interact with children of SITE and many folk artists. Eventually he used many of these children in his feature length rendition of the classic folk tale Charandas Chor (Charandas the Thief) in 1975. He made it for the Children's Film Society, India.
To quote film critic Derek Malcolm:

what Benegal has done is to paint a magnificent visual recreation of those extraordinary days and one that is also sensitive to the agonies and predicament of a talented woman whose need for security was only matched by her insistence on freedom.

The 1980s
Unlike most New Cinema filmmakers, Benegal has had private backers for many of his films and institutional backing for a few, including Manthan (Gujarat Cooperative Milk Marketing Federation ) and Susman (1987) (Handloom Co-operatives). However, his films did not have proper releases. He turned to TV where he directed serials such as Yatra (1986), for the Indian Railways, and one of the biggest projects undertaken on Indian television, the 53-episode television serial Bharat Ek Khoj (1988) based on Jawaharlal Nehru's book, Discovery of India. This gave him an added advantage, as he managed to survive the collapse of the New Cinema movement in the late 1980s due to paucity of funding, with which were lost many neo-realist filmmakers. Benegal continued making films throughout the next two decades. He also served as the Director of the National Film Development Corporation (NFDC) from 1980 to 1986.

Following the success of these four films, Benegal was backed by star Shashi Kapoor, for whom he made Junoon (1978) and Kalyug (1981). The former was an interracial love story set amidst the turbulent period of the Indian Rebellion of 1857, while the latter was based on the Mahabharata and was not a big hit, although both won Filmfare Best Movie Awards in 1980 and 1982, respectively.

Benegal's next film Mandi (1983), was a satirical comedy about politics and prostitution, starring Shabana Azmi and Smita Patil. Later, working from his own story, based on the last days of Portuguese in Goa, in the early 1960s, Shyam explored human relationships in Trikal (1985).

Soon, Shyam Benegal stepped beyond traditional narrative films and took to biographical material to achieve greater freedom of expression. His first venture in this genre was with a documentary film based on Satyajit Ray's life, Satyajit Ray, in 1985. This was followed by works such as Sardari Begum (1996) and Zubeidaa, which was written by filmmaker and critic Khalid Mohamed.

In 1985 he was a member of the jury at the 14th Moscow International Film Festival.

The 1990s and beyond
The 1990s saw Shyam Benegal making a trilogy on Indian Muslim women, starting with Mammo (1994), Sardari Begum (1996) and Zubeidaa (2001). With Zubeidaa, he entered mainstream Bollywood, as it starred top Bollywood star Karishma Kapoor and boasted music by A. R. Rahman.

In 1992, he made Suraj Ka Satvan Ghoda (Seventh Horse of the Sun), based on a novel by Dharmavir Bharati, which won the 1993 National Film Award for Best Feature Film in Hindi. In 1996 he made another film based on the book The Making of the Mahatma, based on Fatima Meer's, The Apprenticeship of a Mahatma. This turn to biographical material resulted in Netaji Subhas Chandra Bose: The Forgotten Hero, his 2005 English language film. He criticised the Indian caste system in Samar (1999), which went on to win the National Film Award for Best Feature Film.

Benegal is the current president of the Federation of Film Societies of India. He owns a production company called Sahyadri Films.

He has authored three books based on his own films: The Churning with Vijay Tendulkar (1984), based on Manthan; Satyajit Ray (1988), based on his biographical film, Satyajit Ray; and The Marketplace (1989), which was based on Mandi.

In 2009 he was a member of the jury at the 31st Moscow International Film Festival.

Recent projects
In 2008, his film Welcome to Sajjanpur, starring Shreyas Talpade and Amrita Rao, was released to a good response. Its music was composed by Shantanu Moitra, and it was produced by Chetan Motiwalla. Shyam Benegal is slated to direct an epic musical, Chamki Chameli, inspired by Georges Bizet's classic Spanish opera Carmen. The story revolves around the eponymous Chamki, a beautiful gypsy girl with a fiery temper and is written by Shama Zaidi. The music is by A. R. Rahman and lyrics are by Javed Akhtar.

In March 2010, Benegal released the political satire Well Done Abba.

One of Benegal's future projects is a film based on the life of Noor Inayat Khan, daughter of Inayat Khan and descendant of Tipu Sultan, who served as a British spy during World War II.

Benegal made a comeback on the small screen with Samvidhaan, a 10-part mini-series revolving around the making of the Indian Constitution, to be aired on Rajya Sabha TV from 2 March 2014. Along with Benegal, Tom Alter, Dalip Tahil, Sachin Khedekar, Divya Dutta, Rajendra Gupta, K K Raina, and Ila Arun were seen at the press conference for the TV series.

Government of Bangladesh has confirmed Benegal would direct the biopic of Sheikh Mujibur Rahman named Mujib: The Making of a Nation. The film will be released presumably by 2022.

Personal life
Shyam Benegal is married to Nira Benegal and has a daughter named Pia Benegal, a costume designer, who worked for many films.

Filmography

Awards and nominations

Non Feature Films
 1984 Best Historical Reconstruction for Nehru 
 1985 Best Biographical Film for Satyajit Ray

Feature Films
 1986 Best Director for Trikal
 1993 Best Feature Film in Hindi for Suraj Ka Satvan Ghoda
 1995 Best Feature Film in Hindi for Mammo
 1996 Best Feature Film in English for The Making of the Mahatma
 1997 Best Feature Film in Urdu for Sardari Begum
 1999 Best Feature Film for Samar
 1999 Best Feature Film on Family Welfare for Hari-Bhari
 2001 Best Feature Film in Hindi for Zubeidaa
 2005 Nargis Dutt Award for Best Feature Film on National Integration for Netaji Subhas Chandra Bose: The Forgotten Hero
Best Film on Other Social Issues for Well Done Abba

Filmfare Awards
 1980 Best Director for Junoon

Cannes Film Festival
 1976: Golden Palm: Nishant: Nominated

Berlin International Film Festival
 1974 Golden Berlin Bear for Ankur: Nominated

Moscow International Film Festival
 1981 Golden Prize: Kalyug
 1997 Golden St. George: Sardari Begum: Nominated
All Lights India International Film Festival
 2015 Lifetime Achievement Award

Nandi Awards
B. N. Reddy National Award for contribution to Indian Cinema

Honours
 1970 Homi Bhabha Fellowship (1970–72)
 1976 Padma Shri
 1989 Sovietland Nehru Award
 1991 Padma Bhushan
 2012 D. Litt. Honoris Causa of the University of Calcutta
 2013 ANR National Award
 2016 D. Litt. "Honoris Causa" of ITM University, Gwalior (M.P.)

Bibliography
 Benegal on Ray: Satyajit Ray, a Film, by Shyam Benegal, Alaknanda Datta, Samik Banerjee. Seagull Books, 1988. .
 Shyam Benegal's the Churning (Manthan): Screenplay, by, Vijay Tendulkar, Shyam Benegal, Samik Banerjee. Seagull Books, 1984. .

References

Further reading
 Shyam Benegal (BFI World Directors) - Sangeeta Datta. 2003, British Film Institute. .
 Bollywood Babylon: Interviews with Shyam Benegal, William van der Heide. 2006, Berg Publishers. .
 BBC's Tom Brook interviews Shyam Benegal on 25 August 2006
 Girish Karnad interviews Shyam Benegal, National Film Theatre, 2002
 Sen, Meheli (2011) "Vernacular Modernities and Fitful Globalities in Shyam Benegal's Cinematic Provinces" on manycinemas.org 1, 8-22, Online, pdf-version
 New Indian Cinema in Post-Independence India; The Cultural Work of Shyam Benegal’s Films, By Anuradha Dingwaney Needham, 2013
Shyam Benegal, Philosopher and Filmmaker, By Samir Chopra, 2021.

External links

Shyam Benegal's Retrospective Abu Dhabi Sept27-30,2012 by Indian Film Society of UAE

'Shyam Benegal: A Life in Pictures' interview at BAFTA
Shyam Benegal on Upperstall
 Awards & recognition for Shyam Benegal's films

Osmania University alumni
20th-century Indian film directors
Indian male screenwriters
Recipients of the Padma Shri in arts
Recipients of the Padma Bhushan in arts
Hindi-language film directors
Indian documentary filmmakers
Filmfare Awards winners
Nominated members of the Rajya Sabha
Dadasaheb Phalke Award recipients
Film directors from Hyderabad, India
1934 births
Living people
Best Director National Film Award winners
21st-century Indian film directors
Best Original Screenplay National Film Award winners
Special Jury Award (feature film) National Film Award winners
Producers who won the Best Feature Film National Film Award
Directors who won the Best Feature Film National Film Award
Directors who won the Best Film on Family Welfare National Film Award
Directors who won the Best Film on National Integration National Film Award
Directors who won the Best Film on Other Social Issues National Film Award